Changhoz Dam is a large dam near Karak in Khyber Pakhtunkhwa, Pakistan.

Location

See also
List of dams and reservoirs in Pakistan

Notes

Dams in Pakistan
Dams completed in 2007